Abraham Akinlalu is a former Anglican bishop in Nigeria.  He is Bishop Emeritus of the Anglican Diocese of Oke-Osun; he retired in 2019.

He was elected as Bishop of Oke-Osun in 2010 on the retirement of Bishop Fasogbon.

References

Living people
21st-century Anglican bishops in Nigeria
Year of birth missing (living people)
Anglican bishops of Oke-Osun